Yoruboid is a 'megagroup' of 14 related Yoruba language clades, composed of the Igala group of dialects spoken in south central Nigeria, and the Edekiri group spoken in a band across Togo, Ghana, Benin and southern Nigeria, including the Itsekiri of Warri Kingdom.

Name
The name Yoruboid derives from its most widely spoken member, Yoruba, which has around 55 million primary and secondary speakers. Another well-known Yoruboid language is Itsekiri (about 1,000,000 speakers). The Yoruboid group is a branch of Defoid which also includes the Akoko and Ayere-Ahan languages.

The term Defoid itself is a derivative combination using the individual terms; "Ede" (meaning 'language' in most lects within the grouping), "Ife" - A city of profound cultural significance to speakers of the diverse lects, and oid, a suffix meaning "to be like" or "In the same manner as". The Defoid group itself is a branch of the Benue–Congo subfamily of the wider Niger–Congo family of languages.

All Yoruboid languages are tonal, with most of them having three level tones. Grammatically, they are isolating with a subject–verb–object basic word order and share significant degrees of both structural and lexical similarities.

Languages
Igala is a key Yoruboid language, spoken by 1.8 million people in the Niger-Benue confluence of central Nigeria; it is excised from the main body of Yoruboid languages to the west by Ebira and the northern Edoid languages. Igala is closely related to both Yoruba and Itsekiri languages.

The Itsekiris are a riverine Yoruboid people who live in the Niger Delta region of Nigeria. They maintain a distinct identity separate from other Yoruboid people but speak a very closely related language. Their neighbouring languages are the Urhobo, the Okpe, the Edo, the Ijo, and the Mahin / Ugbo, Yoruba dialects spoken in neighbouring Ondo State.

Subdivisions

 

* - All dialects in the Ede cluster share between 85-95% lexical similarity and are thus all mutually intelligible without needing different specialized literature to achieve  universal understanding. 
** - Itsekiri is actually most closely related to SEY (South-Eastern Yoruba), and is a divergent branch thereof, but has a different standard writing orthography.
*** - Some scholars classify Olukumi as separate variant of Nuclear Yoruba, and others as a dialect of SEY.

Names and locations
Below is a list of selected Yoruboid language names, populations, and locations from Blench (2019).

See also
Proto-Yoruboid language
List of Proto-Yoruboid reconstructions (Wiktionary)

References

External links
Proto-Yoruba-Igala Swadesh list (N. Aubry, H. Friedman & K. Pozdniakov 2004)

 
Volta–Niger languages